Marrying My Daughter Twice is a South Korean drama series starring Yang Jin-sung, Seo Ha-joon, Park Soon-chun and Jang Seung-jo. It aired on SBS Monday through Friday at 8:30am for 120 episodes from January 4 to June 17, 2016.

Plot
This revolves around the woman's son-in-law (Hyun-tae) who gets remarried but Unknown to her, her daughter-in-law (Sophie) is actually her real daughter whom she put in an orphanage due to Sophie's adopted grandmother who instigated her.

Sophie found out that her mother-in-law is actually her real mother. She first hated her for abondoning her but also find out that it's her grandmother's fault her mother abondoned her. Jason Choi a rich guy who is in love with Sophie decided to become KP Group's CEO by hiring an imposter to pose as the real Kim Ming Sue (Matthew "Matt" Kim) because only if Matt Kim would give all his possessions in the company will he become CEO in order to spite Sophie. But this made Hyun-tae to become suspicious of Matt Kim since he's been missing for so many years and began searching. Jason realised that Hyun-tae is searching for the real Kim Ming Sue, he went to Sophie's adopted father who reveals the real Kim Ming Sue to him and when he went to expose him of bringing an imposter, Jason ran him over with his car but luckily he survived but he is in a critical condition. No known that Jason was the one who ran over Sophie's dad except for a girl who loves Jason and has proof but promises to give him the proof if he agrees to make her his number 1 lady to which he agrees and he destroyed the evidence.

Cast

Main
Seo Ha-joon as Kim Hyeon-tae 
Yang Jin-sung as Park Soo-kyeong
Park Soon-chun as Lee Jin-sook 
Jang Seung-jo as Choi Jae-yeong

Supporting
Kil Yong-woo as Park Tae-ho
Hwang Young-hee as Ma Seon-yeong
Lee Jae-eun as Oh Yeong-sim
Seol Jung-hwan as Park Soo-cheol
Seo Woo-rim as Mrs. Bang
Kim Ha-gyoon as Choi Dal-seok
Han Young as Baek Jin-joo
Yoon Ji-yoo as Lee Ga-eun
Park Jae-min as Cha Ik-joon
Jang Jung-hee as Cheon Ok-soon
Park Seong-geun as Goo Min-sik
Jung Kyung-ho as Kang Woo-sik

Special appearance
Lee Si-won as Oh Yeong-chae

References

External links
 

2016 South Korean television series debuts
2016 South Korean television series endings
Seoul Broadcasting System television dramas
South Korean romance television series
Korean-language television shows